The Institute of Astronomy (IoA) is the largest of the three astronomy departments in the University of Cambridge, and one of the largest astronomy sites in the United Kingdom. Around 180 academics, postdocs, visitors and assistant staff work at the department.

Research at the department is made in a number of scientific areas, including exoplanets, stars, star clusters, cosmology, gravitational-wave astronomy, the high-redshift universe, AGN, galaxies and galaxy clusters. This is a mixture of observational astronomy, over the entire electromagnetic spectrum, computational theoretical astronomy, and analytic theoretical research.

The Kavli Institute for Cosmology is also located on the department site. This institute has an emphasis on The Universe at High Redshifts. The Cavendish Astrophysics Group are based in the Battcock Centre, a building in the same grounds.

History 

The institute was formed in 1972 from the amalgamation of earlier institutions:
 The University Observatory, founded in 1823. Its Cambridge Observatory building now houses offices and the department library.
 The Solar Physics Observatory, which started in Cambridge in 1912. The building was partly demolished in 2008 to make way for the Kavli Institute for Cosmology.
 The Institute of Theoretical Astronomy, which was created by Fred Hoyle in 1967. Its building is the main departmental site (the Hoyle Building), with a lecture theatre added in 1999, and a second two-storey wing built in 2002.

From 1990 to 1998, the Royal Greenwich Observatory was based in Cambridge, where it occupied Greenwich House on a site adjacent to the Institute of Astronomy.

Teaching 
The department teaches 3rd and 4th year undergraduates as part of the Natural Sciences Tripos or Mathematical Tripos. Around 30 students normally study the masters which consists of a substantial research project (around 1/3 of the masters) and students have an opportunity to study courses such as General Relativity, Cosmology, Black Holes, Extrasolar Planets, Astrophysical Fluid Dynamics, Structure and Evolution of Stars & Formation of Galaxies. In addition, there are around 12 to 18 graduate PhD students at the department per year, mainly funded by the STFC. The graduate programme is particularly unusual in the UK as the students are free to choose their own PhD supervisor or adviser from the staff at the department, and this choice is often made as late as the end of their first term.

Notable current staff 
An incomplete list of notable current members of the department.
 Cathie Clarke
 Carolin Crawford
 George Efstathiou
 Andrew Fabian 
 Gerry Gilmore
 Douglas Gough 
 Paul Hewett
 Nikku Madhusudhan
 Richard McMahon
 Max Pettini
 James E. Pringle
 Martin Rees
 Christopher Reynolds (Plumian Professor of Astronomy)
 Christopher Tout
 Anna Zytkow

Notable past members and students 
Here are some notable members of the department and its former institutes.

 Suzanne Aigrain
 George Airy
 Robert Stawell Ball
 James Challis
 John Couch Adams
 Donald Clayton
 Arthur Eddington
 Richard Ellis
 Roger Griffin
 Stephen Hawking
 Fred Hoyle
 Jamal Nazrul Islam
 Harold Jeffreys
 Donald Lynden-Bell
 Jayant Narlikar
 Jeremiah Ostriker
 Robert Woodhouse

Telescopes 

The Institute houses several telescopes on its site. Although some scientific work is done with the telescopes, they are mostly used for public observing and astronomical societies. The poor weather and light-pollution in Cambridge makes most modern astronomy difficult. The telescopes on the site include:
 The Northumberland Telescope donated by the Duke of Northumberland in 1833. This is a  diameter refractor on an English mount.
 The smaller Thorrowgood Telescope, on extended loan from the Royal Astronomical Society. The telescope is an  refractor.
 The 36-inch Telescope, built in 1951.
 The Three-Mirror Telescope, which is a prototype telescope with a unique design to have wide field of view, sharp images and all-reflection optics.

The institute's former 24" Schmidt Camera was donated to the Spaceguard Centre in Knighton, Powys in Wales in June 2009.

The Cambridge University Astronomical Society (CUAS) and Cambridge Astronomical Association (CAA) both regularly observe. The nstitute holds public observing evenings on Wednesdays from October to March.

Public activities 

The department holds a number of events involving the general public in astronomy. These include or have included:
 Open evenings on Wednesdays during the winter, with a talk given by a member of the institute followed by observing in clear weather
 Hosting the Astroblast conference
 Annual sculpture exhibition showing work of Anglia Ruskin University
 Annual open day during the Cambridge Science Festival
 A monthly podcast, the 'Astropod', aimed at the general public (the Astropod originally ran from 2009 to 2011, and was relaunched in 2020)
 Extra observing nights for special events such as IYA Moonwatch  and BBC stargazing live

Library 
The institute library is housed in the old Cambridge Observatory building. It is a specialist library concentrating on the subjects of astronomy, astrophysics and cosmology. The collection has approximately 17,000 books and subscribes to about 80 current journals. The library also has a collection of rare astronomical books, many of which belonged to John Couch Adams.

Achievements 
Among the significant contributions to astronomy made by the institute, the now decommissioned Automatic Plate Measuring (APM) machine was used to create a major catalogue of astronomical objects in the northern sky.

References

External links 
 Institute of Astronomy at the University of Cambridge
 Kavli Institute of Cosmology, Cambridge
 Images from the Institute of Astronomy Library

Astronomy institutes and departments
Astronomy, Institute of
Research institutes in the United Kingdom
Astronomy in the United Kingdom
Educational institutions established in 1972